The 1990 World Men's Curling Championships was held at the Rocklundahallen in Västerås, Sweden from April 1–7.  The men's winner team Canada skipped by Ed Werenich.

Teams

Round-robin standings

Round-robin results

Draw 1

Draw 2

Draw 3

Draw 4

Draw 5

Draw 6

Draw 7

Draw 8

Draw 9

Tiebreaker

Playoffs

References
 

World Men's Curling Championship
Curling
World Mens Curling Championship, 1990
Curling competitions in Sweden
April 1990 sports events in Europe
Sports competitions in Västerås